1-888-88-DREAM is the first extended play by American record label Dreamville. It was first released on June 12, 2019 by Dreamville Records and Interscope Records. It contains the dual singles "Down Bad" featuring J. Cole, JID, Bas, EarthGang, and Young Nudy and "Got Me" featuring Ari Lennox, Omen, Ty Dolla Sign, and Dreezy, from the label's compilation album, Revenge of the Dreamers III  released in July 2019.

Background
Under the "umbrella" 1-888-88-DREAM, both singles were released on Wednesday, June 12, 2019. Dreamville representatives used the hotline phone number to talk to fans and also play some exclusive tracks from the label's compilation album, Revenge of the Dreamers III. The EP’s title is referencing the “1-888-88-DREAM” phone number that Cole used to announce the original Revenge of the Dreamers in 2014.

Track listing
Credits and personnel adapted from Tidal.

Notes
  signifies a co-producer

Sample credits
 "Got Me" contains a sample of "Come Over", written by Faith Evans, Floyd Howard and Carl Thompson, as performed by Faith Evans.

Personnel
Credits adapted from Tidal.

 Miguel Scott – recording 
 Jeff Thompson – recording 
 Juro "Mez" Davis – mixing 
 Joe LaPorta – mastering

Release history

References

Dreamville Records albums
Hip hop EPs
2019 EPs